Nemophas nigriceps is a species of beetle in the family Cerambycidae. It was described by Vitali in 2013. It is known from Sulawesi.

References

nigriceps
Beetles described in 2013